The 1995 New Orleans Saints season was the 29th season in Saints history.

Offseason

NFL draft

Personnel

Staff

Roster

Regular season

Schedule

Standings

Awards and records 
 Jim Everett, franchise record, most passing yards in one season, 3,970 yards 
 Jim Everett, franchise record, most touchdown passes in one season, 26 touchdown passes

References

External links 
 Saints on Pro Football Reference
 Saints on jt-sw.com

New Orleans Saints Season, 1995
New Orleans Saints seasons
New